Magnus Norman was the defending champion but did not compete that year.

Rainer Schüttler won in the final 6–3, 6–4 against Michel Kratochvil.

Francisco Clavet set an ATP tournament record for the shortest match in the first round when he defeated Shan Jiang in 25 minutes, 6–0, 6-0.

Seeds
A champion seed is indicated in bold text while text in italics indicates the round in which that seed was eliminated.

  Andre Agassi (first round)
  Rainer Schüttler (champion)
  Michel Kratochvil (final)
  Francisco Clavet (semifinals)
  Álex Calatrava (first round)
  Andrei Stoliarov (first round)
  Lars Burgsmüller (first round)
  Andrew Ilie (first round)

Draw

References

External links
 2001 Heineken Open Shanghai Draw

Kingfisher Airlines Tennis Open
2001 ATP Tour